The Science of Hitting is a book written by Major League Baseball player Ted Williams in 1970 and revised in 1986. The book provides advice on hitting in baseball, with detailed illustrations, and anecdotes from Williams' career.

Summary 
The book includes sections on:
 How to Think Like a Pitcher and Guess the Pitch
 The Three Cardinal Rules for Developing a Smooth Line-Driving Swing
 The Secrets of Hip and Wrist Action
 Pitch Selection
 Bunting
 Hitting the Opposite Way

Major League Baseball books